Cherry Muhanji is the pen name of Jeannette Delaine Washington (born April 26, 1939, in Detroit, Michigan), an American writer.

She is best known for her novel Her, which won a Ferro-Grumley Award and a Lambda Literary Award in 1991, and the anthology Tight Spaces, which she copublished with Kesho Y. Scott and Egyirba High and which won an American Book Award in 1988. She has also published poetry and short stories in literary magazines and anthologies and is currently working on a memoir.

Muhanji holds a doctorate in English, anthropology and African American World Studies from the University of Iowa. She has taught at various colleges and universities, including the University of Minnesota, Goddard College and Portland State University.

Muhanji's only novel, Her, was released in 1990. It explores the relationships between a community of black women in Detroit.

References

1939 births
American women novelists
American women poets
LGBT African Americans
Living people
20th-century American novelists
American LGBT poets
American LGBT novelists
African-American poets
Poets from Michigan
20th-century American women writers
20th-century American poets
American Book Award winners
Novelists from Michigan
Lambda Literary Award for Debut Fiction winners
African-American novelists
20th-century African-American women writers
20th-century African-American writers
21st-century African-American people
21st-century African-American women
21st-century LGBT people